Sadazane (written: 定実) is a masculine Japanese given name. Notable people with the name include:

, Japanese calligrapher
, Japanese samurai and daimyō

Japanese masculine given names